SRX can refer to:

 Singapore Real Estate Exchange
 Cadillac SRX
 Yamaha SRX motorcycles
 Juniper Networks security product series
 SRX expansion boards  by Roland
 Segmentation Rules eXchange standard 
 Superstar Racing Experience, car racing series
 Ghardabiya Airbase IATA code